Mihama may refer to:
Mihama, Aichi, a town in Aichi Prefecture
Mihama, Fukui, a town in Fukui Prefecture
Mihama, Mie, a town in Mie Prefecture
Mihama, Wakayama, a town in Wakayama Prefecture
Mihama-ku, a ward in Chiba, Chiba
 Mihama, a district in Chatan, Okinawa